The 1993 Virginia Attorney General election was held on November 2, 1993, to elect the next attorney general of Virginia. The Republican nominee, Jim Gilmore, defeated the Democratic nominee, William Dolan, by around 12 percent.

General election

Candidates
Jim Gilmore (R)
William Dolan (D)

Results

References

Attorney General
1993
Virginia